Listen Here is the second studio album by Australian country music singer Jasmine Rae. The album was released on 4 March 2011 and peaked at number 35 on the ARIA Charts.

At the ARIA Music Awards of 2011, the album was nominated for ARIA Award for Best Country Album.

Background and release
Listen Here was announced in December 2010 with the release of its lead single, "Hunky Country Boys".

Track listing

Charts

Weekly charts

Year-end charts

Release history

References

Jasmine Rae albums
2011 albums